Long Stretch of Lonesome is the ninth studio album by American country music artist Patty Loveless, released on September 30, 1997. Three singles charted in the top 20 on the Billboard Hot Country Singles & Tracks chart. Highlights are "High on Love," "To Have You Back Again" and the George Jones-backed "You Don't Seem to Miss Me," each of which both charted in the top 20. "High on Love" was co-written by Jeff Hanna of the Nitty Gritty Dirt Band. The single "Like Water Into Wine" charted at number 57, the first of Loveless' singles since 1986 to not chart in the country top 40. The album went on to be certified Gold for shipments of over 500,000 copies in the U.S.

Track listing

Personnel

Musicians

 Deborah Allen – background vocals
 Susan Ashton – background vocals
 Eddie Bayers – drums
 Richard Bennett – acoustic guitar, electric guitar
 Michael Black – background vocals
 Nanette Bohannon-Britt – background vocals
 Tom Britt – slide guitar
 Kathy Burdick – background vocals
 Mary Chapin Carpenter – background vocals
 Vickie Carrico – background vocals
 Jerry Douglas – lap steel guitar
 Dan Dugmore – electric guitar, steel guitar
 Stuart Duncan – fiddle, mandolin
 Paul Franklin – slide guitar, steel guitar
 Steve Gibson – acoustic guitar, electric guitar, Quatra guitar 
 Emory Gordy Jr. – bass guitar
 Owen Hale – drums
 Vicki Hampton – background vocals
 Mike Henderson – electric guitar
 Tim Hensley – background vocals
 John Hobbs – piano, keyboards, Hammond B-3 organ
 John Barlow Jarvis – piano
 George Jones – background vocals on "You Don't Seem to Miss Me"
 Kostas – background vocals
 Mike Lawler – keyboards
 Butch Lee – Hammond B-3 organ
 Patty Loveless – lead vocals
 Mac McAnally – background vocals
 Raul Malo – electric guitar
 Liana Manis – background vocals
 Brent Mason – electric guitar
 Kim Richey – background vocals
 Mike Rojas – keyboards
 Harry Stinson – drums, background vocals
 Biff Watson – acoustic guitar, electric guitar

 Strings on "Long Stretch of Lonesome"
Strings arranged by Emory Gordy Jr.
 Violins – David Davidson, Connie Heard, Clara Olson, Christian Teal
 Violas – Kathryn Plummer, Kris Wilkinson
 Cello – Anthony LaMarchina

Charts

Weekly charts

Year-end charts

References

1997 albums
Epic Records albums
Patty Loveless albums
Albums produced by Emory Gordy Jr.